Das Salzburger Seengebiet or Salzburger Seenland is a group of natural lakes northeasterly of the city of Salzburg in Salzburg-Umgebung District (Region Flachgau) and is part of Salzburg alpine foothills.

List of lakes
 Wallersee
Trumer Seen, consisting of
 Obertrumer See
 Mattsee (a.k.a. „Niedertrumer See“) and
 Grabensee
 Egelseen (3)

List of municipalities in this area

 Berndorf bei Salzburg
 Henndorf am Wallersee
 Köstendorf
 Mattsee
 Neumarkt am Wallersee
 Obertrum  am See
 Schleedorf
 Seeham
 Seekirchen am Wallersee
 Straßwalchen

See also 
 List of lakes of Austria
 Salzkammergut

References

External links 

 Regionalverband Salzburger Seenland 
 Tourismus-Website „salzburger-seenland.at“ by Seenland Tourismus GmbH 

Lake groups of Austria
Lakes of Salzburg (state)
Salzach basin